The Greek Orthodox Metropolis of Denver is one of the Metropolises of the Greek Orthodox Archdiocese of America with 50 parishes.

Parishes
They include:
 Annunciation Greek Orthodox Cathedral (Houston)

References

Dioceses of the Greek Orthodox Archdiocese of America